Levee Township is located in Pike County, Illinois. As of the 2010 census, its population was 47 and it contained 39 housing units. Levee formed as Douglas Township from Pike Township in November 1875. Douglas changed its name to Levee in April, 1876.

Geography

Demographics

References

External links
City-data.com
Illinois State Archives

Townships in Pike County, Illinois
Townships in Illinois